Pseudathyma martini, or Martin's false sergeant, is a butterfly in the family Nymphalidae. It is found in Ivory Coast, Ghana, Nigeria, and the Republic of the Congo. The habitat consists of forests.

References

Butterflies described in 2002
Pseudathyma